Neika is a rural locality in the local government areas (LGA) of Hobart and Kingborough in the Hobart LGA region of Tasmania. The 2016 census recorded a population of 198 for the state suburb of Neika.
It is a suburb of Hobart, to the north-west of Kingston.

History 
Neika was gazetted as a locality in 1970. It is believed to be an Aboriginal word for “hill”.

Neika Post Office opened on 13 January 1913 and closed in 1969.

Geography
Long Creek forms much of the northern boundary. The North West Bay River flows through the south-west corner.

Road infrastructure 
Route B64 (Huon Road) runs through from south to north.

References

Towns in Tasmania
Localities of City of Hobart
Localities of Kingborough Council